Sadeng may refer to:
 Sadêng, a village in China
 , a kingdom in Indonesia